The men's team cross country event was part of the track and field athletics programme at the 1920 Summer Olympics. It was the second appearance of this event. The competition was held on Monday, August 23, 1920.  

Eight nations competed as they have at least three competitors participating in the individual cross country race.

Results

The first three runners for each nation to finish in the individual cross country race counted towards the team results. Their placings were summed, and the team with the lowest sum won.

References
 sports-reference.com
 
 

Cross country team
1920